Charlotte Rose Craig (born February 2, 1991 in Riverside, California) is a member of the U.S. 2008 Summer Olympic team competing in Taekwondo in the 49 kg (108 lb) division.

Biography
Craig was born in Riverside, California, to parents Jim Craig and Charlotte Craig Sr. She currently lives in Murrieta, California.
When Craig was 2 years old, she had a dysfunctional kidney and had it removed. Her doctors told her parents to have her not participate in hard contact sports. When Craig was 5 years old, her father and mother agreed to sign her up for taekwondo. At first, they had her wear extra padding to protect her only kidney, but soon she started to work without it.
Charlotte currently trains with Jimmy Kim, a 1988 Olympic Gold Medalist in taekwondo. Charlotte and her mother drive 90 minutes from Murrieta to Laguna Niguel four times a week to train with Jimmy Kim.

References

External links
 
 
 
 
Charlotte Craig on Instagram

1991 births
American female taekwondo practitioners
Living people
Olympic taekwondo practitioners of the United States
Taekwondo practitioners at the 2007 Pan American Games
Taekwondo practitioners at the 2008 Summer Olympics
Sportspeople from Riverside, California
People from Murrieta, California
Taekwondo practitioners at the 2015 Pan American Games
World Taekwondo Championships medalists
Pan American Games competitors for the United States
21st-century American women